Ay ay ay is the second album by Argentine rock band Los Piojos. Recorded and mixed in 1994 at Del Cielito Records. It was the first work with Alfredo Toth and Adrián Bilbao as guides. The Album was remastered in 2007 by El Farolito Discos.

Track listing 
All tracks by Andrés Ciro Martínez except where noted.

 "Arco" [Goal] – 4:12
 "Babilonia" [Babylon] – 2:28
 "Ay ay ay" [Ay ay ay] – 5:18
 "Pistolas" [Pistols] – 4:55
 "Angelito" [Little angel] – 5:32
 "Manise" [Manise] – 3:55
 "Ximenita" [Ximenita] – 1:53
 "Ando ganas (Llora llora)" [I'm looking forward (Cries cries]– 5:32
 "Fumigator" [Fumigator] – 4:33
 "Muy despacito" [Very slowly] (Fernández, Martínez) – 6:04
 "Es sentir" [It's to feel] – 4:30
 "Te diría" [I would say to you] – 5:18
 "Arco II" [Goal II] – 2:24

Personnel 
Andrés Ciro Martínez – vocals, guitar, harmonica, backing vocals
Daniel Fernández - guitar, backing vocals
Gustavo Kupinski - guitar, backing vocals
Miguel Ángel Rodríguez - bass guitar, backing vocals
Dani Buira – drums, percussion, backing vocals
Alfredo Toth – backing vocals, producer
Adrián Bilbao – mixing, recording technician
Adrián Rivarola – recording assistant
Guillermina Montello – photography
Alvaro Villagra – remastering

External links 
 Ay ay ay 

1994 albums
Los Piojos albums